The 1998–99 IHL season was the 54th season of the International Hockey League, a North American minor professional league. 16 teams participated in the regular season, and the Houston Aeros won the Turner Cup.

Regular season

Eastern Conference

Western Conference

Turner Cup-Playoffs

Pre-Playoffs

(NE3) Cincinnati Cyclones vs. (C3) Indianapolis Ice

(C1) Michigan K-Wings vs. (C2) Fort Wayne Komets

(MW2) Manitoba Moose vs. (MW4) Milwaukee Admirals

(SW2) Long Beach Ice Dogs vs. (MW3) Kansas City Blades

Quarterfinals

(NE1) Detroit Vipers vs. (C3) Indianapolis Ice

(NE2) Orlando Solar Bears vs. (C1) Michigan K-Wings

(SW1) Houston Aeros vs. (SW2) Long Beach Ice Dogs

(MW1) Chicago Wolves vs. (MW2) Manitoba Moose

Semifinals

(NE1) Detroit Vipers vs. (NE2) Orlando Solar Bears

(SW1) Houston Aeros vs. (MW1) Chicago Wolves

Turner Cup Final

(NE2) Orlando Solar Bears vs. (SW1) Houston Aeros

Player statistics

Scoring leaders
Note: GP = Games played; G = Goals; A = Assists; Pts = Points; PIM = Penalty minutes

Leading goaltenders
Note: GP = Games played; Min – Minutes played; GA = Goals against; GAA = Goals against average; W = Wins; L = Losses; T = Ties; SO = Shutouts

Awards

All-Star teams

References

Bibliography

External links
 Season 1998/99 on hockeydb.com

IHL
IHL
International Hockey League (1945–2001) seasons